Esquire Shoe Polish was the best selling shoe polish brand in America from the 1940s to the 1960s.

During the Great Depression, Sam and Albert Abrams, chemists and entrepreneurs from Brooklyn, took over an ailing boot polish maker, the Knomark Manufacturing Company of Williamsburg, Brooklyn. In 1938 they purchased the Esquire brand. After a saturation advertising campaign in 1944, the company became the best selling shoe polish manufacturer in the US. A 1951 advertising campaign featured the singer and television star Kate Smith. In the late 1950s, they sold the Esquire brand and the 1914-built Esquire Building on 330 Wythe Avenue in Brooklyn. In 1957, Revlon acquired the Esquire brand which made annual sales of 15 million dollars. Revlon sold the Esquire shoe polish brand and other Esquire product brands in 1969. The Sara Lee company purchased the Esquire brand in 1987, which discontinued it in favor of their Kiwi brand. In 1994, Papercraft Corp. of Pittsburgh purchased the Esquire brand from Sara Lee. In 2010, Griffin Brands acquired the brand. It still exists in the form of shine polish today. 

The Esquire Building was acquired in 1984 and converted to condominiums by Stephanie Eisenberg in 2000.

References

Revlon brands
Shoe polish
Manufacturing companies established in 1938
1938 establishments in New York City
Products introduced in 1938